Franz Berghammer (November 20, 1913 – July 7, 1944) was an Austrian field handball player who competed in the 1936 Summer Olympics. He was part of the Austrian field handball team, which won the silver medal. He played one match.

He was killed in action during World War II.

References

External links
profile

1913 births
1944 deaths
Austrian male handball players
Olympic handball players of Austria
Field handball players at the 1936 Summer Olympics
Olympic silver medalists for Austria
Olympic medalists in handball
Medalists at the 1936 Summer Olympics
Austrian military personnel killed in World War II
Missing in action of World War II
20th-century Austrian people